Charles Lorenzo Bundy (born November 6, 1959) is a former Minor League Baseball player and current manager of the Winston-Salem Dash, the High-A Chicago White Sox affiliate. He has held Major League Baseball coaching positions with the Colorado Rockies, Arizona Diamondbacks, Los Angeles Dodgers and Miami Marlins.

Playing career
He attended James Madison University, where he was a standout first baseman and ranks second on the school's all-time home run list.

Bundy was drafted by the Baltimore Orioles in the 22nd round of the 1977 MLB draft but did not sign.

After college he signed with the Texas Rangers as an undrafted free agent and also spent time in the Pittsburgh Pirates and Montreal Expos systems.

He played eight seasons in the minor leagues and the Mexican League, finishing with a career batting average of .318 with 135 home runs and 535 RBIs.

Coaching career
He retired as a player after the 1989 season and became a manager in the Montreal Expos farm system, with the Gulf Coast Expos in 1990 and then in the South Atlantic League with the Sumter Flyers and Albany Polecats.

In 1993–1994 he managed the Burlington Bees in the Midwest League.

Bundy moved to the Florida Marlins system in 1995 as the hitting coach for the Brevard County Manatees in the Florida State League. He was promoted to manager of the Manatees for the 1997 season. In 1998, the Marlins made him the minor league outfield and baserunning coach for their whole farm system.

In 1999 he was hired as the Bullpen coach for the Colorado Rockies Major League team under manager Jim Leyland.

When Leyland left the team after the season, Bundy became the Rockies minor league outfield and baserunning coach for 2000–2001.

In 2002, he joined the Pawtucket Red Sox of the International League as hitting coach for 2002, before holding the same position in 2003 with the El Paso Diablos of the Texas League. The Diablos led the league with a .282 batting average that season.

In 2004, he was hired by the Arizona Diamondbacks as the hitting coach for the Tucson Sidewinders, a position he held through 2006. The Sidewinders led the PCL with a .289 batting average and 844 runs scored in 2006, and captured the PCL and Triple-AAA Championships. He also briefly served as interim bench coach for the Diamondbacks during the second half of the 2004 season after manager Bob Brenly and most of his staff were abruptly fired.

In 2007, he joined the Los Angeles Dodgers organization as the Manager of the AAA Las Vegas 51s of the Pacific Coast League, a role he maintained in 2008.

Bundy returned to the Diamondbacks in 2009 as first base coach under manager Bob Melvin.

After Melvin was fired, Bundy returned to the Dodgers system as manager of the Arizona League Dodgers in 2010 and then he became manager of the Albuquerque Isotopes from 2011–2013 and was named Pacific Coast League Manager of the Year in 2012.

On November 11, 2013, he was named the new third base coach of the Dodgers. He was removed from that position on August 17, 2015, but remained on the staff as an outfield coach for the rest of the season.

He has also managed in the Mexican Pacific League (1991–present), winning three championships throughout the course of his coaching career: one with the Navojoa during the 1999–2000 season,
another with Hermosillo during the 2006–2007 season, and his most recent with Mazatlán during the 2008-2009 season. He has also twice been named Manager of the Year.

On December 4, 2015, he was announced as the new outfield and baserunning coach for the Miami Marlins. Following the 2017 season, it was revealed that Bundy would not return in his role with the team.

Bundy was named manager of the Class AAA Pericos de Puebla for the 2018 season.

On August 15, 2018, Bundy was announced as the new manager of the Tomateros de Culiacan of the Mexican Pacific League for the 2018-19 season. However, he was fired after an 8–10 start to the season.

In November 2018, he was named new manager for the Generales de Durango of the Mexican League for the 2019 season. He was fired on May 20, 2019, following a 15–24 start to the season. He later joined the Acereros de Monclova as their bench coach.

Later in 2019, he returned to manage the Mayos de Navojoa of the Mexican Pacific League.

On January 6, 2020, Bundy was named the manager of the Binghamton Rumble Ponies, the Double-A New York Mets affiliate. However, the 2020 season was eventually canceled due to the COVID-19 pandemic. Bundy returned as manager of the Rumble Ponies in 2021, posting a 47–60 record.

On February 2, 2022, Bundy was announced as new manager of the Winston-Salem Dash, the High-A Chicago White Sox affiliate.

References

External links

1959 births
Living people
African-American baseball players
African-American baseball coaches
Baseball players from Philadelphia
Baseball coaches from Pennsylvania
American expatriate baseball players in Canada
American expatriate baseball players in Mexico
James Madison Dukes baseball players
James Madison University alumni
Alexandria Dukes players
Albuquerque Isotopes managers
Asheville Tourists players
Hawaii Islanders players
Indianapolis Indians players
Jacksonville Expos players
Nashua Pirates players
Las Vegas 51s managers
Colorado Rockies (baseball) coaches
Arizona Diamondbacks coaches
Los Angeles Dodgers coaches
Miami Marlins coaches
Major League Baseball bench coaches
Major League Baseball bullpen coaches
Major League Baseball first base coaches
Major League Baseball third base coaches
Minor league baseball coaches
Vancouver Canadians players
Caribbean Series managers
Mexican League baseball managers
Diablos Rojos del México players
21st-century African-American people
20th-century African-American sportspeople